Ignacio is a male Spanish and Galician name originating either from the Roman family name Egnatius, meaning born from the fire, of Etruscan origin, or from the Latin name "Ignatius" from the word "Ignis" meaning "fire". This was the name of several saints, including the third bishop of Antioch (who was thrown to wild beasts by emperor Trajan) and Saint Ignatius of Loyola. Variants include the archaic Iñacio, the Italian Ignazio, the German Ignatz, the Catalan Ignaci, the Basque Iñaki, Iñigo, Eneko, and the diminutives Nacho/Natxo, Iggy, and Iggie.

Ignacio can refer to:

People
 Ignacio Chávez (disambiguation)
 Ignacio González (disambiguation)
 Ignacio López (disambiguation)

 Arts and entertainment
 Ignacio Aldecoa, 20th-century Spanish author
 Ignacio Berroa, 20th-21st-century Cuban jazz drummer
 Ignacio Cervantes Kawanagh, 19th-20th-century Cuban virtuoso pianist and composer
 Ignacio Figueredo, 20th-century Venezuelan folk musician
 Ignacio Merino 19th-century Peruvian painter
 Ignacio Piñeiro Martínez, 19th-20th-century black Cuban musician and composer
 Ignacio Serricchio, 21st-century Argentinian-American actor
 Ignacio Zuloaga y Zabaleta, 19th-20th-century Spanish painter

 Military

 Ignacio Allende (Ignacio José de Allende y Unzaga), 19th-century captain of the Spanish Army in Mexico
 Ignacio Elizondo, 18th-19th-century New Leonese royalist general of Spanish and Basque ancestry
 Ignacio Zaragoza Seguín, 19th-century general in the Mexican army

 Politics
 Chief Ignacio, a 19th-20th-century leader of the Ute tribe
 Ignacio Bunye, 20th-21st-century Filipino politician
 Ignacio Comonfort, 19th-century Mexican politician and military officer
 Ignacio Manuel Altamirano Basilio, 19th-century Mexican writer, journalist, teacher and politician
 Ignacio Mier Velazco (born 1961), Mexican politician
 Ignacio Walker, Chilean politician

 Religion
 Ignacio López de Loyola or Ignatius of Loyola (1491–1556), founder of the Jesuits
 Ignacio Ellacuría, 20th-century Jesuit priest
 Ignacio Martín-Baró, 20th-century Spanish scholar, social psychologist, philosopher and Jesuit priest

 Science and technology
 Ignacio Bernal, 20th-century Mexican anthropologist and archaeologist
 Ignacio Bolívar y Urrutia, 19th-20th-century Spanish naturalist and entomologist
 Ignacio Rodríguez (programmer), Uruguayan programmer

 Sports
 Ignacio Ambríz, 20th-21st-century Mexican football defender
 Ignacio Arroyo (basketball), Chilean basketball player
 Ignacio Camacho, 21st-century Spanish footballer for Atlético Madrid
 Ignacio Corleto, 21st-century Argentine Rugby Union footballer
 Ignacio Escamilla, 20th-century Mexican freestyle swimmer
 Ignacio Fragoso, 20th-century Mexican long-distance runner
 Ignacio Gabari, 21st-century Spanish professional racecar driver
 Ignacio Garrido, 20th-century Spanish professional golfer
 Ignacio Javier Gómez Novo, or Nacho Novo, 20th-21st-century Spanish footballer
 Ignacio Risso Thomasset, 20th-21st-century Uruguayan footballer
 Ignacio Rodríguez (footballer), 20th-century Mexican football goalkeeper
 Ignacio Rodríguez (basketball) Marín, 20th-21st-century Spanish basketball player
 Ignacio Scocco, 21st-century Argentine footballer
 Ignacio Fernández (footballer), 21st-century Argentine footballer
 Ignacio Trelles, 20th-century Mexican football player and coach
 Ignacio Vázquez (footballer, born 1971), 20th-century Mexican footballer
 Ignacio Vázquez (footballer, born 1971) Barba, 20th-21st-century Mexican footballer
 Ignacio Zoco Esparza, 20th-century Spanish footballer

 Other

 Ignacio Anaya, 20th-century inventor of nachos
 Hermenegildo Ignacio Peralta, 18th-19th-century Spanish settler in California
 Ignacio Ramonet, 20th-century Spanish journalist and writer
 Ignacio Ramos, 20th-21st-century former United States Border Patrol Agent

Fictional characters 
 Ignacio Suarez, on the television show Ugly Betty
 Nacho Varga, on the television show Better Call Saul

References 

Spanish masculine given names